Mussett is a surname. Notable people with the surname include: 

Marjorie Mussett (1922–2004), British biologist and endocrinologist
Tory Mussett (born 1978), Australian actress